The Cerro Pelado Fire was a wildfire that burned in the southern Jemez Mountains in Sandoval County, southwest of Los Alamos, in the state of New Mexico in the United States as part of the 2022 New Mexico wildfire season. The cause of the fire is still under investigation. The wildfire started on April 22, 2022, during extreme fire weather conditions. , the Cerro Pelado Fire has burned  and is 100% contained.

Events 
On April 22, 2022, large portions of New Mexico experienced extreme fire conditions, including a red flag warning from the National Weather Service (NWS) office in Albuquerque. The fire was first reported that afternoon, it was officially named the Cerro Pelado Fire after the nearby Cerro Pelado mountain. The cause of the fire is under investigation.

The Cerro Pelado Fire was partially burning within the burn scar of the 2011 Las Conchas Fire, and near those of the 2013 Thompson Ridge Fire and the 2017 Cajete Fire.
 
On June 15, 2022, it was announced that the Cerro Pelado Fire was fully contained. The New Mexico Type 3 Team will now hand charge to the Jemez Ranger District June 15, 2022.

Impacts

Closures 
During the fire, it prompted the closure of the nearby Bandelier National Monument and the Valles Caldera National Preserve, as well as New Mexico State Road 4 from mile marker 27 to mile marker 59.

Evacuations 
There are no longer evacuation orders

Weather/Health 
Smoke from the Cerro Pelado Fire, in addition to the Calf Canyon/Hermits Peak Fire and Cooks Peak Fire also burning in northern New Mexico, has contributed to poor air quality throughout the region.

Progression and containment status

¹April 23 true acreage is unknown due to inaccurate mapping.

See also 

 Calf Canyon/Hermits Peak Fire
 2022 New Mexico Wildfire Season

References

External links 

 Cerro Pelado Fire information at InciWeb
 New Mexico Fire Information

2022 in New Mexico
2022 New Mexico wildfires
Wildfires in New Mexico
Santa Fe National Forest
Jemez Mountains
April 2022 events in the United States